P. acaulis may refer to:
 Pedicularis acaulis, a perennial green root parasite plant species in the genus Pedicularis
 Penstemon acaulis, a plant species in the genus Penstemon
 Peperomia acaulis, a radiator plant species in the genus Peperomia
 Phacelia acaulis, a scorpionweed species in the genus Phacelia
 Phoenix acaulis, a palm species endemic to northern India and Nepal
 Primula acaulis, a garden plant species

Synonyms
 Podococcus acaulis, a synonym for Podococcus barteri, a palm species found in tropical Africa